Iran Intelligence Community refers to 16 separate active intelligence agencies in Iran. To conduct activities, Intelligence Coordinating Council or ICC was created which is made up of agency heads. Presence of 16 agencies was announced for the first time by the Fars News Agency in 2014.

Members 
 Ministry of Intelligence, is main intelligence organization working under government.

The Fars News Agency report names four other agencies as:

 Intelligence Organization of the Islamic Revolutionary Guard Corps
 Intelligence Protection Organization of the Islamic Revolutionary Guard Corps
 Intelligence Unit of the Islamic Republic Army
 Intelligence Unit of the Islamic Republic Police

An illustration published alongside the article, reveals insignia of other agencies as:
 Intelligence Protection Organization of Islamic Republic of Iran Army
 The Commander-in-Chief's General Bureau for Intelligence Protection
 Intelligence Protection Organization of the Armed Forces General Headquarters
 Cyber Police
 Iranian Public Security and Intelligence Police
 Center for Investigating Organized Crime

See also 
 Parallel Intelligence Agency
Ministry of Intelligence

References 

Intelligence communities
Iranian intelligence agencies
Iranian security organisations